Thomas Beaufort may refer to:
 Thomas Beaufort, Duke of Exeter (1377–1426), English military commander, briefly Chancellor of England
 Thomas Beaufort, Count of Perche (c. 1405–1431), English military commander